Berrimah was an electoral division of the Legislative Assembly in Australia's Northern Territory. It was named after the town of Berrimah. It existed from 1983 to 1987, when it was replaced by Palmerston.

Members for Berrimah

Election results

Elections in the 1980s

References

Former electoral divisions of the Northern Territory